Poecilasthena aedaea is a moth in the  family Geometridae. It is found in Australia, including Tasmania.

References

Moths described in 1926
Poecilasthena
Moths of Australia